Jang Yeong (born 12 February 1934) is a South Korean speed skater. He competed at the 1956 Winter Olympics and the 1960 Winter Olympics.

References

1934 births
Living people
South Korean male speed skaters
Olympic speed skaters of South Korea
Speed skaters at the 1956 Winter Olympics
Speed skaters at the 1960 Winter Olympics
Place of birth missing (living people)